The Civil War Museum in Bardstown, Kentucky, is a collection of five attractions along what is called "Museum Row". It was established in 1996 by Dr. Henry Spalding. The leading attraction is the Civil War Museum, which is the fourth largest American Civil War Museum and is dedicated to the Western Theater of the war.

The four attractions are:
 Civil War Museum of the Western Theater:  organized by chronology and geography. It is the largest collection of Civil War Artifacts of the Western Theater in America. A notable exhibit is the flag of the 2nd Kentucky Cavalry, which was captured when John Hunt Morgan was captured after his Raid ended in Ohio.
 Pioneer Village:  Commonly called the "Civil War Village", it features buildings built in Nelson County, Kentucky, from 1776 to 1820.
 Women's Civil War Museum:  Opened in 1999, it is the only museum that looks into the role of women during the American Civil War.  It is in the historic (c1840) Wright Talbott House.
 Hal Moore Military Museum:  Honors those who came from the middle of the United States who fought for freedom from the first Revolutionary War to Operation Desert Storm.

See also
 Kentucky in the American Civil War
 List of attractions and events in the Louisville metropolitan area

External links
 Official site

Buildings and structures in Bardstown, Kentucky
Louisville, Kentucky, in the American Civil War
American Civil War museums in Kentucky
Museums in Nelson County, Kentucky
Natural history museums in Kentucky
Open-air museums in Kentucky
Women's museums in Kentucky
Museums established in 1996
1996 establishments in Kentucky
Women in the American Civil War